The Meeting of Parliament Act 1694 (6 & 7 Will & Mary c 2), also known as the Triennial Act 1694, is an Act of the Parliament of England. This Act is Chapter II Rot. Parl. pt. 1. nu. 2. The act currently requires that Parliament hold a session at least once every three years.

This Act required Parliament to meet annually and to hold general elections once every three years.

This Act was partly in force in Great Britain at the end of 2010.

The whole Act was repealed for the Republic of Ireland by section 3 of, and Schedule 1 to, the Electoral Act 1963.

Sections 3 and 4 were repealed by the Statute Law Revision Act 1867.

See also
Triennial Acts

References
Halsbury's Statutes,
John Raithby (editor). The Statutes of the Realm. 1819. Volume 6. Page 510. Digitised copy from British History Online.

External links
The Meeting of Parliament Act 1694, as amended, from the National Archives.
List of repeals in the Republic of Ireland from the Irish Statute Book

Acts of the Parliament of England
1694 in law
1694 in England
William III of England
Acts of the Parliament of the United Kingdom concerning the House of Commons